Ziarat Rural District is in the Central District of Dashtestan County, Bushehr province, Iran. At the census of 2006, its population was 6,881 in 1,525 households; there were 6,932 inhabitants in 1,875 households at the following census of 2011; and in the most recent census of 2016, the population of the rural district was 6,646 in 1,939 households. The largest of its 11 villages was Ziarat, with 2,758 people.

References 

Rural Districts of Bushehr Province
Populated places in Dashtestan County